Glas Istre is a Croatian regional daily newspaper published in Pula which mainly covers stories of interest from the Istria region in the northwest of the country. Established in 1943 as a regional newsletter of the Yugoslav Partisans, the paper continued to be published after World War II, and became a daily in November 1969.

The paper spent the majority of its later history as a regional supplement published in the Rijeka-based nationally circulated newspaper Novi list, and between 1979 and 1991 the editor-in-chief of Novi list was also in charge of Glas Istre. In the 1990s the paper became increasingly independent of its parent publication and eventually evolved into a separate regional daily.

See also
List of newspapers in Croatia

References

External links
 

Daily newspapers published in Croatia
Newspapers established in 1943
Croatian-language newspapers
Mass media in Pula
1943 establishments in Croatia
Newspapers published in Yugoslavia